The majority floor leader of the Senate of the Philippines, or simply the Senate majority floor leader, is the leader elected by the political party or coalition of parties that holds the majority in the Senate of the Philippines.

By tradition, the Senate president or any presiding officer gives the majority leader priority in obtaining the floor and is also the traditional chairman of the Committee on Rules. The majority leader also manages the business of the majority bloc in the Senate.

The incumbent Senate majority floor leader is Joel Villanueva.

List of majority floor leaders

See also
 Minority Floor Leader of the Senate of the Philippines

External links
Senate of the Philippines

References